Souss-Massa-Drâa was formerly one of the sixteen regions of Morocco from 1997 to 2015. It covered an area of 70,880 km² and had a population of 3,601,917 (2014 census). The capital is Agadir. One of the major languages spoken in this region of Morocco is tasoussit variant of Tashelhit.

Administrative divisions
The region was made up of the following provinces and prefectures:

 Prefecture of Agadir-Ida-Ou Tanane (now part of the Souss-Massa Region)
 Préfecture of Inezgane-Ait Melloul (now part of the Souss-Massa Region)
 Shtouka Ait Baha Province (now part of the Souss-Massa Region)
 Ouarzazate Province (now part of the Drâa-Tafilalet Region)
 Sidi Ifni Province (since 2009; now part of the Guelmim-Oued Noun Region)
 Taroudant Province (now part of the Souss-Massa Region)
 Tinghir Province (since 2009; now part of the Drâa-Tafilalet Region)
 Tiznit Province (now part of the Souss-Massa Region)
 Zagora Province (now part of the Drâa-Tafilalet Region)

External links 

 The official website of Souss-Massa-Drâa

Former regions of Morocco